Altice Arena (formerly MEO Arena; also referred to by its original name, Pavilhão Atlântico) is a multi-purpose indoor arena in Lisbon, Portugal. The arena is among the largest indoor arenas in Europe and the largest in Portugal with a capacity of 20,000 people and was built in 1998 for Expo '98.

History
Plans to build a multipurpose arena in Lisbon date back to the first discussions of the Expo '98 Master Plan. At the time, the city lacked a versatile facility able to accommodate concerts, congresses and sporting events of big scope. The existing structures, both in Lisbon and in Portugal alike, either had limited capacity (up to 4,000 people), or were difficult to adapt to non-conventional events, such as world class indoor sports competitions. Another shortcoming of existing venues was the lack of technical infrastructure deemed necessary to host modern concerts, musicals and to allow for proper live TV coverage.

The country needed an arena to fill the existing gap between smaller indoor halls, like the Lisbon Coliseum, and open-air stadia. As a consequence, Portugal would not host games of important indoor sports championships and no major concerts would take place in the country in periods of cold and rainy weather.

The decision to build the Pavilhão Atlântico within the masterplan of Expo 98 allowed the arena to have a catchment area well beyond the city of Lisbon. Being a short distance from Gare do Oriente and several major highway interchanges, allows the arena to draw spectators from all over the country.

In July 2012, the arena was sold to Arena Atlântico S.A. for €21,2 million. In May 2013, Portugal Telecom acquired the naming rights to the venue, re-branding it as MEO Arena after its services brand MEO. In October 2017, following the acquisition of Portugal Telecom by Altice, the venue was renamed Altice Arena.

Architecture

The building was designed by Portuguese architect Regino Cruz, who is the author of several government and office buildings in Brazil and in Portugal, in association with Skidmore, Owings & Merrill (SOM). SOM has been awarded first prize in the contests for the Olympic stadiums of Manchester and Berlin, and is responsible for designing many big sporting pavilions in the US (Portland, Philadelphia, Oakland and Minneapolis). The studio is also a co-designer of the Vasco da Gama Tower, located at the northern end of the Parque das Nações in Lisbon. The shape of the Altice Arena is reminiscent of a large flying-saucer, a sea turtle's shell or a horseshoe crab. Such a unique shape demanded out-of-the box thinking for its underpinnings, both for structural and symbolic reasons. The roof, for example, sits atop a wood grid, designed in the shape of a carrack. Being part of a world expo celebrating the world's oceans and 15th-century Portuguese discoveries, wood was considered more fitting than either concrete or steel.

The main goals of the design were: 1) Minimise the visual impact generated from such a big structure; 2) rational energy use; and 3) simplify the flow of spectators in and out of the building.

The main façade is oriented towards the south, which increases sun exposure during the colder winter months, at the same time preventing direct sunlight in the summer months. This exposure allows the reduction of heating and air conditioning costs, while at the same time natural ventilation outlets on top of the building provide air circulation and cooling. By placing the main floor 6.4 metres below ground level the architects allowed for a generously high roof, while at the same time reducing the external footprint and minimizing heat exchange (as a result of the smaller surface area exposed to the weather). The external glass façade is shaded by overhanging panels, designed to allow sunlight only during winter months. A system of external moving blinds further allows natural lighting to enter the pavilion.

Accessibility is also straightforward by means of a short stadium-seating-like external staircase that surrounds the entire building.

EXPO'98
During EXPO'98, the building was called the Pavilion of Utopia and housed the spectacle "Oceans and Utopias".

The EXPO'98 theme was "Knowledge of the Seas or of the Future", and while other expositions approached the "ocean" themes from artistic, scientific or historical perspective, at the Utopian Pavilion, the designers took a symbolic, dreamlike, and/or magical approach to the exhibits. As such, during the 132 days of the exposition, the Pavilion was an open space to showcase works of imagination, reflecting the fears, myths and legends that throughout history, have been associated with the World's oceans. Visitors were awarded with sights of Daedalus, Greek Gods, mythical heroes such as Hercules, as well as colorful displays portraying the birth of mankind and gods, the Big Bang, the Deluge, Atlantis, the Age of Discovery and space travel, just to name a few. Written by François I. Confine and Philippe Genty, and produced by Rozon, the show (which was presented four times a day) mixed classic theatrical elements and modern multimedia technology.

Events
The arena holds the European record for attendance in club Futsal when 10,076 spectators saw Sporting losing to FC Barcelona (3x5) in the 2014–15 UEFA Futsal Cup final-four.

Croatia men's national handball team became world champion for the first time there, after beating Germany at the 2003 World Men's Handball Championship Final.

The arena will host matches for the 2028 European Men's Handball Championship.

The arena was also the final venue of the 1999 FIBA Under-19 World Championship, between USA and Spain. The 2001 IAAF World Indoor Championships, the 2002 World Fencing Championships, the 2000 ATP Finals also took place there and the biggest music competition in the world - Eurovision Song Contest 2018.

One of the most remarkable non-sporting events to ever take place there were the MTV Europe Music Awards in 2005.

Web Summit

In September 2015, Web Summit co-founder and CEO Paddy Cosgrave announced that the event would be held in Lisbon for three consecutive editions, from 2016 to 2018. Congrave cited the local startup scene and a "cosmopolitan city with better infrastructure conditions and a larger number of hotel rooms" for the decision.

The three-day event held from 7 to 10 November at the MEO Arena, site of Expo '98, drew 53,056 attendees from more than 150 countries and more than 1,500 start-ups spread over 21 venues. Among the more than 600 speakers were a number of tech top executives from around the world, including John Chambers of Cisco Systems, Facebook CTO Mike Schroepfer, Twitter founder Jack Dorsey and Tesla's Elon Musk. Also speaking at the event were prominent figures from non-tech areas, such as U2 frontman Bono, Salil Shetty of Amnesty International and Joana Coles, Editor in Chief of Cosmopolitan, as well as footballer Luís Figo and both the Portuguese President Marcelo Rebelo de Sousa and Prime Minister António Costa.

On 3 October 2018, Paddy Cosgrave and Prime Minister António Costa announced a €110 million deal for Web Summit to remain in Lisbon until 2028. The deal includes doubling the capacity of Altice Arena and the surrounding fairgrounds (Feira Internacional de Lisboa).

The 2018 Web Summit, held from 5 to 8 November, is expected to draw 70,000 attendees from 170 countries, 1,800 start-ups and 1,500 investors. The speakers of 1,200 talks include Twitter co-founder and Medium CEO Evan Williams, Tim Berners-Lee, European Commissioner for Competition Margrethe Vestager, President & Chief strategy officer at Samsung Electronics Young Sohn, Lisa Jackson as environmental director of Apple, Secretary-General of the United Nations António Guterres, Chief Brand Officer of WWE Stephanie McMahon, Pinterest CEO and Co-Founder Ben Silbermann, president and chief legal officer of Microsoft Brad Smith, Twitch CEO Emmett Shear, former British Prime Minister Tony Blair, CTO and co-founder of Slack Cal Henderson, Booking.com CEO Gillian Tans, Shell CEO Ben van Beurden, Oculus Founder Palmer Luckey, TripAdvisor CEO Stephen Kaufer, Sophia The Robot, Major Lazer DJ Jillionaire (Christopher Leacock) and the 2016 Formula 1 World Champion Nico Rosberg.

Concerts
Enrique Iglesias has performed on 13 December 2015 as a part of his Sex and Love Tour and on 30 May 2018 as a part of Enrique Iglesias Live shows.

Madonna ended her Re-Invention Tour with two sold-out shows for 33,460 fans in September 2004. It was the first time that Madonna performed in Portugal.

The tenth installment of The Dave Matthews Band Live Trax series was recorded at Pavilhão Atlântico in May 2007.

Kylie Minogue performed there on 4 July 2009. It was the first time that Minogue performed in Portugal.

Britney Spears performed a sold-out show on 9 November 2011, as part of her Femme Fatale Tour.

Justin Bieber performed a sold-out show at the venue on 11 March 2013, as part of Believe Tour.

One Direction performed a sold-out show in 2013 on the venue as part of their Take Me Home Tour (One Direction).

For 2009, many events had already been booked a year in advance: one of the biggest acts was Green Day in September and later Muse on 29 November as part of their Resistance Tour.

In 2010, the venue held Lady Gaga's The Monster Ball Tour show on 10 December and a week after, on 16 December, Thirty Seconds to Mars concert as part of their Into the Wild Tour.

Beyoncé performed two consecutive sold-out shows in 2014, on 26 and 27 March, as part of The Mrs. Carter Show World Tour.

Miley Cyrus performed at the venue on 15 June 2014, as part of her Bangerz Tour, using the show's footage for her Bangerz Tour DVD.

Shakira holds the record for the biggest attendance with her Oral Fixation Tour back in 2007 with a completely sold-out show.

On 10 November 2014, Lady Gaga brought her ArtRave: The Artpop Ball to the MEO Arena, which is already called "the biggest production ever made" on this venue until then.

On 4 May 2015, 5 Seconds of Summer started their first world tour Rock Out With Your Socks Out Tour with a sold-out show.

Adele performed two consecutive sold-out shows in 2016, on 21 and 22 May, as part of Adele Live 2016.

Justin Bieber performed in MEO Arena for the 2nd time with the Purpose World Tour on 25 November 2016, with a sold-out show.

Ariana Grande performed in MEO Arena with the Dangerous Woman Tour on 11 June 2017.

Queen+Adam Lambert performed at Altice Arena on 7 June 2018.

Robbie Williams will perform at the arena on 27 March 2023, as part of the European leg of his XXV Tour.
 International

 Adele, Aerosmith, Britney Spears, Miley Cyrus, Justin Bieber, 5 Seconds of Summer, Charles Aznavour, One Direction, Thirty Seconds to Mars, Bruno Mars, 50 Cent, ABC, Bryan Adams, Anastacia, Rick Astley, Charles Aznavour, B52s, Backstreet Boys, Beyoncé, Biffy Clyro, Billie Eilish, The Black Eyed Peas, The Black Keys, The Blackout, Andrea Bocelli, Sarah Brightman, Busta Rhymes, Carbon/Silicon, Belinda Carlisle, Cirque du Soleil, Eric Clapton, Joe Cocker, Leonard Cohen, Coldplay, The Corrs, Megadeth, Slayer, Deep Purple, Joaquín Cortés, The Cure, Curiosity Killed the Cat, Dave Matthews Band, Depeche Mode, Plácido Domingo, The Doors, Dua Lipa, Bob Dylan, The Eagles, Foreigner, Lady Gaga, Green Day, Ariana Grande, Guns N' Roses, Hardwell, Ben Harper, Enrique Iglesias, Julio Iglesias, Il Divo, Incubus, Iron Maiden, Elton John, Jack Johnson, Jennifer Lopez, Jessie J, Juanes, Judas Priest, Nik Kershaw, Alicia Keys, Korn, Lenny Kravitz, Blink-182, Lemar, Limp Bizkit, Linkin Park, Madness, Madonna, Marillion, Marilyn Manson, Ricky Martin, Meat Loaf, Megadeth, Metallica, George Michael, Kylie Minogue, Moby, Muse, Oasis, The Offspring, OneRepublic, Pearl Jam, P!nk, Prima Donna, The Prodigy, Pussycat Dolls, Eros Ramazzotti, Queen + Adam Lambert, Rammstein, Red Hot Chili Peppers, Rihanna, Rosalía, Santana, Scorpions, Shakira, Sigur Rós, Badgalcaya, Soy Luna Live, Selena Gomez, Simply Red, Slayer, Slipknot, The Stranglers, Supertramp, Testament, Tokio Hotel, The Tubes, U2, Wako, Roger Waters, Westlife, Whitesnake, The Who, Kim Wilde, Robbie Williams and Yes

 Portuguese

 Ana Moura, Pedro Abrunhosa, Carlos do Carmo, David Carreira, Mickael Carreira, Tony Carreira, Clã, D'ZRT, Da Weasel, GNR, Mariza, Rui Veloso and Xutos e Pontapés

 Brazilian

 Diante do Trono, Luan Santana, Gusttavo Lima, Roberto Carlos, Daniela Mercury, Maria Rita, Ivete Sangalo, Sandy & Junior, Caetano Veloso and Maria Gadú

Other staged events
In 2018, Altice Arena staged the 63rd annual Eurovision Song Contest, where Netta won with her song "Toy" for Israel.

Affiliations
The Atlantic Pavilion is member of the Associação de Turismo da Lisboa (ATL) and active member of the European Arenas Association (EAA). Through these connections the Altice Arena management has establish close relationships with the main auditoriums and arenas in Europe and benefited from their synergies of scale.

References

External links

 

Indoor arenas in Portugal
Sports venues in Lisbon
Music venues in Portugal
Concert halls in Portugal
Sports venues completed in 1998
Music venues completed in 1998
Skidmore, Owings & Merrill buildings
Indoor track and field venues
World's fair architecture in Lisbon
Tennis venues in Portugal
Parque das Nações
Altice Portugal